Taipei Gida was a Taiwanese professional baseball team that existed from 1997 to 2002. It was one of the four Taiwan Major League (TML) teams and was based in Taipei, Taiwan. Its historical sponsors included local Sampo Corporation and Macoto Bank, so the team was called "Taipei Sampo Gida" (台北聲寶太陽) or "Taipei Macoto Gida" (台北誠泰太陽).

The team's history could be traced back to 1991 when Sampo Corporation's then chairman Chen Sheng-tian (陳盛沺) started to sponsor Chinese Culture University's baseball team. After these student players graduated, Chen formed the amateur baseball team Sampo Giants to host them; he tried to enter the Chinese Professional Baseball League starting 1992. Strangely, Chen's applications were repeatedly rejected, so he decided to cooperate with TVBS's then-chairman Chiu Fu-sheng to form TML and turned Sampo Giants into Taipei Gida. However, Chen finally ceased to support this team by the end of 2000 after long-time losing. Macoto Bank took it up later.

The team's historical performance was not bad, winning the championship twice during TML's 6-season short history. This team is also the only TML team that never annually ranked last in the league. After TML's merger with the Chinese Professional Baseball League in early 2003, the team was absorbed by First Financial Holdings Agan and later La New Bears.

Regular season records 

                                                                                
TML Championships: twice, 1998 and 2000

Notable former players 
Sam Horn
Takehiro Ishii
Lenin Picota
Keith Dishart

External links 
 

Defunct baseball teams in Taiwan
Baseball teams established in 1997
Baseball teams disestablished in 2002
Sport in Taipei
Companies based in Taipei
1997 establishments in Taiwan
2002 disestablishments in Taiwan